Bickleigh is a village and civil parish in the Mid Devon district of Devon, England, about four miles south of Tiverton.  It is in the former hundred of Hayridge. According to the 2001 census it had a population of 239.

The village lies in the valley of the River Exe and there is an attractive medieval stone bridge across the Exe.

Bickleigh, as Bicanleag, is recorded as the location of a charter issued in 904 during the reign of King Edward the Elder.

The village is mentioned in the Domesday Book as Bichelei, meaning "Bicca's meadow".

Bickleigh Castle, the village manor house formerly known as Bickleigh Court, has a Norman chapel and baptismal font.

St Mary's Church 
Bickleigh's church, dedicated to the Virgin Mary, is a medieval church predominantly built in the 14th century, although it still contains a 12th-century south doorway and font. The subsequent restoration of 1843 detracted from its original form. Its tower houses six bells.

The church's history is closely bound with that of the Carew family, lords of the manor, and the church is noted for its Carew family monuments that date from the 16th and 17th century. The family's association continued until the manor's sale in 1922.

The most notable member of the family was Bampfylde Moore Carew (1690–1758), the son of Theodore Carew, Bickleigh's rector. According to his own account, after a number of adventures, Carew became a gipsy and was subsequently elected their king. He was transported to Maryland but escaped back to Britain, and joined Bonnie Prince Charlie's army on its 1745 march to Derby, before returning to Bickleigh until his death. He is buried in the graveyard.

The church is home to carved bench-ends depicting scenes of medieval life. Major John Gabriel Stedman, author of a History of Surinam, d. 1797, was buried here in an unmarked grave near the vestry door.

Attractions 
Farmer Nick Lees and his family have constructed several maize mazes in a field near the village. The subjects include Elizabeth II's Golden Jubilee, the 200th anniversary of the Battle of Trafalgar, the bicentenary of the birth of Isambard Kingdom Brunel and 100th anniversary of the Scouting movement.

It is also the location of one of the biggest vineyards in the South West of England, Yearlstone, which has a state of the art winery, wine bar and cafe. Yearlstone is now 3.5 hectares, and hosts Devon Wine Week in the last week in May each year, a celebration of local food culture. To the northwest of the village on the River Exe is The Fisherman's Cot.

Popular culture 
A persistent myth among the residents of the area is that the village's medieval bridge over the Exe inspired Paul Simon to write Bridge Over Troubled Water; Simon is known to have stayed in the village in the mid-sixties. Although Art Garfunkel denied the rumour in a 2003 interview, stating that Simon had taken the phrase from a Baptist hymn, it is entirely possible that Simon intended more than one allusion.

References

External links

The Bickleigh village website.

Villages in Mid Devon District